Messier 88 (also known as M88 or NGC 4501) is a spiral galaxy about 50 to 60 million light-years away from Earth in the constellation Coma Berenices. It was discovered by Charles Messier in 1781.

Properties

M88 is one of the fifteen Messier objects that belong to the nearby Virgo Cluster of galaxies. It is galaxy number 1401 in the Virgo Cluster Catalogue (VCC) of 2096 galaxies that are candidate members of the cluster. M88 appears to be on or ending a highly elliptical orbit, currently on an approximate or direct course toward the cluster center, which is occupied by the giant elliptical galaxy M87. It is currently 0.3 to 0.48 million parsecs from the center and will come closest to the core in about 200 to 300 million years. Its motion through the intergalactic medium of its cluster is creating, as expected, ram pressure that is stripping away the outer region of neutral hydrogen. To date, this has been detected along the western, leading edge of the galaxy.

This galaxy is inclined to the line of sight by 64°. It is classified as an Sbc spiral, a status between Sb (medium-wound) and Sc (loosely wound) spiral arms. The spiralling arms are very regular and can be followed down to the galactic core. The maximum rotation velocity of the gas is 241.6 ± 4.5 km/s.

M88 is classified as a type 2 Seyfert galaxy, which means it produces narrow spectral line emission from highly ionized gas in the nucleus. In the core region there is a central condensation with a 230 parsec diameter, which has two concentration peaks. This condensation is being fed by inflow from the spiral arms. The supermassive black hole at the core of this galaxy has 107.9 solar masses, or about 80 million solar masses.

In 1999, supernova 1999cl was discovered in this galaxy.

See also
 List of Messier objects
 Messier 98

References

External links

 Spiral Galaxy M88 @ SEDS Messier pages
 

Unbarred spiral galaxies
Virgo Cluster
Coma Berenices
088
04501
07675
41517
Astronomical objects discovered in 1781
Discoveries by Charles Messier